The Bathyteuthoidea are small, mesopelagic to bathypelagic squid that in some ways resemble myopsid squid, such as Loligo and in others the pelagic oegopsid squid. Its two families, the Bathyteuthidae and Chtenopterygidae, each containing a single genus, have previously been included with the oegopsids.

As with the oegopsids, the Bathyteuthoidea lack corneal membranes covering their eyes, something common to myopsid squid, and have paired oviducts, lacking in myopsids. As with the myopsids, bathyteuthoids have tentacle pockets in the head and small suckers on the buccal supports, found only in this group, Loliginidae, and Sepiidae; neither is found in true oegopsids. The Bathyteuthoidea do share the open ocean pelagic habitat with the oegopsid squid, uniting them in that way with that diverse group.

The Bathyteuthidae and Chtenopterygidae differ in body conformation, the internal shell, and in the manner in which buccal supports attach to the lowermost arms (pair IV). Buccal supports attach to the dorsal side of arms IV in the Bathyteuthidae and the ventral side of arms IV in the Chtenopterygidae.

References
 Tree of Life web project: Bathyteuthoidea

Squid